John Bartholomew Parker (born circa 1823 – 2 October 1892) was a Scottish first-class cricketer.

Educated at Harrow School, he made his debut in first-class cricket for the Gentlemen of the North against the Gentlemen of the South at Lord's in 1852, with Parker making two further first-class appearances in 1852 for the Gentlemen of England against the Gentlemen of Kent at Lord's and Canterbury respectively. He played one first-class match in 1853 for the Gentlemen of Marylebone Cricket Club against the Gentlemen of England, before making his final first-class appearance four years later for the Gentlemen of England against the Gentlemen of Kent and Sussex at Canterbury. Playing as a bowler, Parker took 32 wickets in his five first-class matches, at an average of 6.70, with best figures of 5 for 26 against the Gentlemen of Kent and Sussex. He took five wickets in an innings twice and ten wickets in a match once. He died at Edinburgh in October 1892.

References

External links

Date of birth unknown
1892 deaths
People educated at Harrow School
Scottish cricketers
Gentlemen of the North cricketers
Gentlemen of England cricketers
Gentlemen of Marylebone Cricket Club cricketers